The Hiroshima Dragonflies (広島ドラゴンフライズ) are a professional basketball team based in Hiroshima, Japan. In October 2014 they commenced competing in the Western Conference of the Japanese National Basketball League. In September 2016 they joined the B.League, the NBL's successor league, and currently play in the first division's Western Conference.

Formation

In April 2014, following the announcement that the former Japan Basketball League would be restructured as the National Basketball League, a group was launched to support the formation of a professional basketball team in Hiroshima. In May 2014 the group received support from the prefectural basketball association  and an application to join the NBL was submitted in July. In August 2014 the application was approved and the name Hiroshima Dragonflies was decided. In October 2014 an operating company Hiroshima Dragonflies Corporation (株式会社広島ドラゴンフライズ) was established.

Team

Head coach
The inaugural head coach of the Dragonflies was Kenichi Sako, a former Japanese national player. It was the first coaching role for Sako, who was known as "Mr. Basketball" during his playing career that ended in 2011.

The team has not been able to retain a coach during the 2017–2018 season, and players have been filling in to the team's detriment.

Kenichi Sako
Jamie Andrisevic
Shogo Asayama
Shota Shakuno
Takeshi Hotta
Kyle Milling

Roster

Arenas
Hiroshima Sun Plaza
Fukuyama Rose Arena
Shishin-yo Oak Arena
Higashihiroshima Sports Park Gymnasium
Maeda Housing Higashiku Sports Center

Notable players

Clint Chapman
Daniel Dillon
Yusuke Okada
Shannon Shorter
Kosuke Takeuchi
Wendell White
Daiji Yamada
Kai Sotto

References

External links
 Team homepage

 
Basketball teams in Japan
Basketball teams established in 2014
Sports teams in Hiroshima
2014 establishments in Japan